Nakkheeran is a Tamil language biweekly magazine published in Chennai. Nakkheeran Gopal is the founder and editor of the magazine. It was established in 1988 and the first issue came out on 20 April 1988. The magazine is known for its investigative journalism.

Publications group
The magazine is part of Nakkheeran Publications, Which also have Balajothidam, OMM Saravanabava, Iniya Udhayam and Pothu Arivu Ulagam magazines.

References

External links

1988 establishments in Tamil Nadu
Magazines established in 1988
Mass media in Chennai
News magazines published in India
Political magazines published in India
Tamil-language magazines
Weekly magazines published in India